Stareton is a small hamlet in Warwickshire, England. The population is included within Stoneleigh parish. It is situated about half a mile from Stoneleigh Park, between Leamington Spa and Coventry.

External links

Villages in Warwickshire